L'auberge rouge (The Red Inn) is an inn, originally named L'Auberge de Peyrebeille ("the Inn of Peyrebeille"), in the commune of Lanarce in Ardèche, bordering Issanlas and Lavillatte.  In the 19th century, it was the site of a notorious French criminal scandal known as "the Red Inn affair." In 1831, after a customer, Jean-Antoine Enjolras, was found dead by a nearby river with his skull smashed in, the owners of the inn, Pierre and Marie Martin, and their employee, Jean Rochette, were arrested and eventually charged with his murder. During the subsequent trial, numerous witnesses testified to other crimes committed by the accused, including up to fifty murders at the inn, and to aggravating circumstances of rape and cannibalism. There were rumors that the owners used to serve their intended victims meals containing cooked body parts of previous victims.  The accused were only convicted of the murder of Enjolras, and were sentenced to death. They were executed by guillotine in front of the inn, with a crowd of 30,000 on-lookers.

Subsequent scholars have raised doubts about the integrity of the trial. Today, the inn is a tourist attraction.

History

For about 23 years (approximately 1805–1830), Pierre and Marie Martin (née Breysee), kept the inn.  Originally poor farmers, they were said to have accumulated a fortune of 30,000 gold Francs (approximately 600,000 Euros in today's currency) by the time of their death. Pierre Martin was feared by his neighbours as he was a grasping, paid henchman of the local nobility, and had a forceful personality.  The Martins were ultra-royalists; he had assisted nobles returning from exile to recover their land from the farmers on the cheap, and she had hidden a refractory priest.  The political climate in France changed in 1830 with the overthrow of the ultra-royalist Charles X and his replacement by Louis Philippe: the Martins were no longer useful supporters of the regime but rather of its opponents. 
The peasantry of the Ardèche were accustomed to collecting wood in the royal forests, but this had been curbed to protect the interests of sawmills.  Sawmills began to be set on fire at night by bands of men who knew the terrain and had no difficulty in putting the gendarmerie to flight. Worried by this, the prefect had ordered that the rule of law must be restored 
In October 1831, a local horse-dealer, Antoine (Jean-Antoine) Enjolras (or Anjolras), went missing; a justice de paix (local magistrate), Étienne Filiat-Duclaux, determined that Enjolas had visited the inn on October 12, 1831, whilst looking for a lost heifer and had not been seen since. On October 25, the magistrate arrived at the Martins' to investigate the disappearance of Enjolas, whose body was found next day on the banks of the Allier a few kilometres from the inn, his skull smashed and his knee crushed. Pierre Martin and his nephew André Martin were arrested on November 1, 1831. The Martins' servant, Jean Rochette (nicknamed "Fetiche") - incorrectly described in romantic literature as a South American mulatto, but actually a (well-tanned) native of the Ardèche) - was arrested the next day. Marie Martin was not arrested until later because the authorities did not believe at first that a woman could be a murderer.

On June 18, 1833, the trial of  the "four monsters" began at the court of Ardeche in Privas. The accused were linked to the death of Enjolas by the testimony of Claude Pagès, who said that Pierre Martin, Rochette, and a stranger had used a cart to move the body from the inn to the river. A local beggar, Laurent Chaz,  testified in 'patois'; his testimony, as translated into French, was that on the night in question - unable to pay for a bed - he had been thrown out of the inn. He had hidden in a shed only to find himself witnessing the murder of a solitary traveller, Enjolas.

Serial killings at the Red Inn?
More than 100 other witnesses were called to testify, mainly indirect witnesses relaying rumors of the time. The Code Napoleon permitted hearsay evidence to a much greater extent than Anglo-Saxon common law, but even so much of the evidence given was clearly inadmissible. Claims included: 
 The landlady would use the best bits of the corpses to make pâtés and stews for customers to eat 
 Certain farmers had seen human hands simmering in the cooking pot
 Others reported having seen bed sheets or walls stained with blood
 Others recounted that sickening smoke frequently came from the chimneys
 The innkeepers would burn the corpses of their victims, including children, in the bread oven or pretend they were found dead from cold on the snow of the plateau

Jean Rochette's lawyer implicitly accepted that his client was a murderer, pleading that Rochette was not responsible for the murders because he had been unable to break free of the influence of his masters. This plea contributed to the fate of the accused. Some historians think that the culpability of the Martins in the "assassination" of Enjolras is far from being proven, arguing that the latter simply died of a heart attack after having too much to drink, and that this would explain why Marie Martin tried to make him drink herbal tea. The summing-up of the president of the court was effectively a second closing speech for the prosecution; the argument of the defence, that Chaze was a drunken down-and-out whose testimony was implausible, was ignored.

Verdict and Execution

On June 29, after a hearing lasting 7 days, André Martin was acquitted; Pierre Martin, Marie Martin and Rochette were found guilty of only one murder, that of Enjolras, and were sentenced to death. After the rejection of their appeal, and of a plea for clemency to King Louis Philippe, they were returned to the scene of their crime in order to be guillotined in front of their inn by the executioner Pierre Roch and his nephew Nicolas. The execution took place on October 2, 1833, at noon as the bell of Lavillatte rang the Angelus.  When Rochette was about to be executed, he cried, "Cursed masters, what have you not made me do?" The last words of the accused raised suspicion as to the true nature of the innkeepers. It was said that a crowd of approximately 30,000 attended the execution. Paul d'Albigny reports in his book about the Red Inn that, on the day of the execution, a ball was organized in front of the premises.

The current building has been changed since 1831 and is now a tourist attraction in Ardeche, claiming the title of "authentic auberge de Peyrebeille". A terrace was built at the end of the farmhouse, which shelters a museum preserving the furniture of the time, though the decor has been subjected to some changes. To the east of the historic inn, a hotel-restaurant and gas station have been added.

The French expression "ne pas etre sorti de l'auberge" (roughly equivalent to 'not out of the woods yet') is sometimes said to refer to the crimes at Peyrebeille but, whilst they gave additional point to the saying, it predates them.

Film adaptations
 The Red Inn (1951) - directed by Claude Autant-Lara: A crime-comedy with Francoise Rosay and Julien Carette as the innkeepers and Fernandel in the role of a monk to whom they confess their crimes/sins 
remade as  
  - Gérard Krawczyk, with Gérard Jugnot in the role of the priest and Josiane Balasko and Christian Clavier in the roles of the innkeepers.

Books
L'Auberge rouge, a short story by Honoré de Balzac, published in 1831, has no connection with the various events at Peyrebeille.

Among the serious works which have reconsidered the case can be noted Peyrebeille by Felix Viallet and Charles Almeras which reaffirms the guilt of the Martins.

L'Auberge sanglante de Peirebeilhe was a novel by  that was inspired by various events that happened in 1885 and is illustrated by Jose F. Roy.

 prepared to publish in the journal Lyon Républican a serial "The Crimes of Peyrebeille", which was announced in a display by Jules Chéret.

L'Auberge rouge(CNRS Éditions), by historian Thierry Boudignon, challenges the official theory and suggests that the case of the Red Inn was a terrible miscarriage of justice based on rumors, dubious witnesses, and the need to "make an example". It is based on the documents from local and national archives, analyses the procedures of the instruction (preparation of the case), and shows that patois was an obstacle because the clerk of the court "interpreted" in French testimony given in patois, rather than simply translating what witnesses said. It concludes that the objective of the magistrates was to develop a convincing narrative in order to influence the decision of the jury.  Facts forbidden by law were presented in order to discredit the couple; the inadmissibility of some evidence didn't prevent the legal system from using it to secure a conviction.

It abandons the contemporary view that justice was done when the murderers were guillotined. Progressively, the author sows doubt, asking from the evidence reported in contemporary accounts, if this triple execution wasn't the biggest miscarriage of justice in the 19th century.

References

Notes

External links

Scott Sprenger, "Republican Violence, Old Regime Victims: Balzac's Auberge Rouge as Cultural Anthropology," FLS, vol. 32, 2005.

Legal history of France
Suspected serial killers